D115 is a state road on island of Brač in Croatia connecting the town of Bol and the D113 state road, which in turn connects the D115 road to Supetar from where Jadrolinija ferries float to the mainland, docking in Split and the D410 state road.

The road, as well as all other state roads in Croatia, is managed and maintained by Hrvatske ceste, a state-owned company.

Road junctions and populated areas

Sources

State roads in Croatia
Transport in Split-Dalmatia County
Brač